Vita Moda Italia SA, most commonly known as Vita Moda, is a European leather goods manufacturer. The company was founded by leather smith Vito Catalano in 1836, and continues to be family-controlled. The company originated as a custom saddle manufacturer catering to Europe's Royalty and elite, but, by the turn of the following century, had evolved into a fashion accessories manufacturer, specializing in luxury handbags and footwear. Vita Moda's headquarters and main workshops are located on the outskirts of Milan, Italy.

The majority of Vita Moda's annual manufacturing capacity is dedicated to the manufacture of handbags and leather accessories for other houses. The actual manufacturing facility has no signs or published address. This appears an attempt to remain anonymous to protect the brands in manufacturing. Production of Vita Moda branded handbags is estimated at fewer than 20,000 units each year.

References
 http://www.naba.it/topics.php?tId=87

Manufacturing companies established in 1836
Leather manufacturers
Italian companies established in 1836
Manufacturing companies of Italy